Marghub (also Romanized as Marghūb; also known as Mar’oob, Morqūm, and Murghūm) is a village in Kavir Rural District, Deyhuk District, Tabas County, South Khorasan Province, Iran. At the 2006 census, its population was 269, in 84 families.

References 

Populated places in Tabas County